Everyday Pakistan is a photoblog and a collective of photographers from Pakistan.

Started in February 2018 by photojournalist Anas Saleem, the blog has more than 100,000 followers on Instagram.

Awards 
Everyday Pakistan was one of the winners for the year 2019 in the category Citizen Media & Journalism for visually breaking stereotypes and bridging cultural gaps by Social Media for Empowerment awards.

References

External links 
 Everyday Pakistan Website
 

Photoblogs
Internet properties established in 2018